Chryseobacterium chaponense  is a Gram-negative, aerobic and rod-shaped bacteria from the genus of Chryseobacterium which has been isolated from the salmon Salmo salar from the Lake Chapo in Chile.

References

Further reading

External links
Type strain of Chryseobacterium chaponense at BacDive -  the Bacterial Diversity Metadatabase

chaponense
Bacteria described in 2011